Spaceball is a jazz fusion album by organist/keyboardist Larry Young, released on the Arista Records label.

Reception
The Rolling Stone Jazz Record Guide said the album is "a triumph of musicianship over terrible ideas".

Track listing
All tracks composed by Larry Young; except where indicated
 "Moonwalk" - 5:00
 "Startripper" (Terry Philips, Julius Brockington) - 4:44
 "Sticky Wicket" (Terry Philips, Julius Brockington) - 9:26
 "Flytime" (Terry Philips, Julius Brockington) - 4:50
 "Spaceball" - 5:07
 "Message from Mars" - 7:29
 "I'm Aware of You" - 5:09

Personnel
Larry Coryell - vocals
Larry Young - organ, keyboards
Ray Gomez - guitar
David Eubanks - bass
Abdul Hakim - percussion
Danny Toan - guitar
Jim Allington - drums
Al Lockett - flute, vocals, saxophone
Paula West - vocals
Barrett Young - percussion
Farouk Abdoul Hakim - percussion
Clifford Brown - percussion

References

External links 
Spaceball at Allmusic.com

Larry Young (musician) albums
1976 albums
Arista Records albums